905 may refer to:
905, the year
Area codes 905, 289, and 365, a telephone dialing area in southern Ontario, Canada
The 905, a nickname for the region served by the above area codes
"905" (song), a song by The Who, written by John Entwistle, from the 1978 album Who Are You
The Peugeot 905, a sports-prototype racing car
California State Route 905, a highway in San Diego, California, United States